Rome Italia Johnson is a Bahamian former insurance executive who served as the Speaker of the Bahamas House of Assembly from 1992 until 1997.  Also called Speaker, not President, she was the first female to serve in that position.

Career
From 1977 until 1992 she worked in the insurance industry and she was the first female President of the Life Underwriters Association of the Bahamas.

References

Speakers of the House of Assembly of the Bahamas
21st-century Bahamian women politicians
Women legislative speakers
Living people
Insurance
Year of birth missing (living people)